Margaret Court was known by the British press as the 'Australian Amazon."  She was one of the first Australian women to encourage women to integrate weightlifting into their training regime for other sports like tennis.

Bodybuilding was introduced to Australia in 1981.  The sport came over because of American influence.

During the 1980s and 1990s, women's power lifting saw a large expansion in the number of competitors.  Interest in the sport increased as women started adding resistance work to their regular work outs.  There was crossover with other sports.  Australian Commonwealth Games competitors and Australians Olympians who took up the sport include Bev Francis, a shot putter and javelin thrower.

The first Australian woman to set a world record in powerlifting was Jill Bamborough.  She did this in 1978 in the bantam weight when she lifted . A famous Australian powerlifter was Robin Weckert.  She competed in the  class.   Australia has had several world champion powerlifters including Heidi Wittisch in the  class at the 1988 world champions.  That same year, Marilyn Wallen in the  class and Gael Martin in the  class won silver medals.

Bev Francis is an Australian powerlifter who has faced discrimination in the sport as a result of her body type.  Critics had harsh things to state about the amount of muscle mass she possessed, claiming that she had too much muscle.  Some of her critics taunted her at powerlifting events by calling her a freak.

In 1984, there were 257 junior female members of the Australian Amateur Weightlifting Federation.

References

Bibliography

 

Powerlifting
Powerlifting
Weightlifting in Australia